Salvation Jane is a 1927 American crime film directed by Phil Rosen and written by Doris Schroeder. The film stars Viola Dana, J. Parks Jones, Fay Holderness and Erville Alderson. The film was released on March 1, 1927, by Film Booking Offices of America.

Cast       
Viola Dana as Salvation Jane
J. Parks Jones as Jerry O'Day
Fay Holderness as Captain Carrie Brown
Erville Alderson as Gramp

References

External links
 

1927 films
American crime films
1927 crime films
Film Booking Offices of America films
Films directed by Phil Rosen
American silent feature films
American black-and-white films
1920s English-language films
1920s American films